Barry Gallup Sr. is an American former college football coach and college athletics administrator.  He served as the head football coach at Northeastern University from 1991 to 1999, compiling a record of 38–60–1.

Athletic career
Gallup played football at Boston College as a wide receiver where he set many then-school records at the position. Gallup also played basketball in college under Bob Cousy. During his prep years he played at Swampscott High School and Deerfield Academy.

Personal
Gallup resides in Wellesley with wife, Victoria, and they are the parents of Barry Charles Jr., the late Darren Douglas, and the late Lisa Ann.

Head coaching record

References

Year of birth missing (living people)
Living people
American football wide receivers
American men's basketball players
Boston College Eagles football players
Boston College Eagles football coaches
Boston College Eagles men's basketball players
Northeastern Huskies athletic directors
Northeastern Huskies football coaches
People from Wellesley, Massachusetts